Chhatbir Zoo (formally Mahendra Chaudhary Zoological Park), is a zoological park situated close to Zirakpur, India. The zoo was constructed in the 1970s and is home to a large variety of birds, mammals and reptiles.

History 
The zoo was christened as the Mahendra Chaudhury Zoological Park after then governor of Punjab, Mahendhan Choudhry in 1977. A small number of animals brought from the Guwahati Zoo, Assam. It soon became the largest zoo in Punjab.

Location 
Lying on the Chandigarh-Zirakpur-Patiala route, this zoo is located about 20 km away from Chandigarh.

List of species 
The zoo is home to 369 mammals, 400 birds and 20 reptiles.

Non-exhaustive list:

 Asian palm civet
 Asiatic lion
 Barasingha
 Bengal fox
 Bengal tiger
 Blackbuck
 Chinkara
 Chital
 Common marmoset
 Four-horned antelope
 Gaur
 Golden jackal
 Hamadryas baboon
 Himalayan black bear
 Himalayan goral
 Hippopotamus
 Indian crested porcupine
 Indian elephant
 Indian leopard
 Indian spotted chevrotain
 Indian wolf
 Jaguar
 Jungle cat
 Leopard cat
 Lion-tailed macaque
 Nilgai
 Northern pig-tailed macaque
 Rhesus macaque
 Sambar deer
 Sloth bear
 Smooth-coated otter
 Striped hyena

 Black swan
 Common ostrich
 Emu
 Indian peafowl
 Java sparrow
 Painted stork
 Rose-ringed parakeet
 Sarus crane
 White stork

 Gharial
 Green iguana
 Indian cobra
 Indian python
 Indian star tortoise
 Mugger crocodile

Walk-in aviary
Chattbir has India's longest walk-in aviary with 300m long walk showcases 32 species of indigenous and exotic birds. The section is made in five different themes included Terrestrial, Rock & Duck, Woodland, Japanese Trail and Rainforest.

References

External links 
 Chhatbir Zoo
 
 Chhatbir Zoo at TwistCity
 Chandigarh to Chhatbir Zoo

Zoos in India
Protected areas of Punjab, India
1977 establishments in Punjab, India
Zoos established in 1977
Tourist attractions in Chandigarh